Adam Obert (born 23 August 2002) is a Slovak professional footballer who plays as a centre-back for  club Cagliari and the Slovakian football team.

Club career

Youth clubs
Obert is a youth product of the youth academies of Zbrojovka Brno and Sampdoria. In March 2022, he commented on his switch from Genoa to Cagliari, critically highlighting the philosophy of integration of youth players at Sampdoria, stating he did not wish to get lost in Serie C and instead sought challenges with top division senior football. He joined the academy of Cagliari in the summer of 2021.

Cagliari
Obert made his professional debut for Cagliari as a late substitute in a 3–0 Serie A loss to Fiorentina on 24 October 2021. It was his first nomination for a senior team match. Following his arrival at Cagliari and first experiences with the first team, Obert spoke highly of his training experience with and advice from Diego Godín, expressing regret of his departure from Sardinia-based club.

By February 2022, Cagliari had offered Obert a 4.5 year contract extension through to summer 2026 with a 1-year option to extend.

International career

Youth teams
Obert was first recognised in a senior national team nomination on 16 March 2022 by Štefan Tarkovič as an alternate ahead of two international friendly fixtures against Norway and Finland. During the March international fixtures, Obert ended up representing the Slovak U21 side under Jaroslav Kentoš in 2023 Under-21 European Championship qualifiers against Northern Ireland and Spain.

Senior national team
Francesco Calzona first recognised Obert for duties in the squad of Slovak senior national team in November 2022 nomination as a direct call-up for two friendly fixtures against Montenegro and Marek Hamšík's retirement game against Chile. On 17 November 2022, during a fixture versus Montenegro at Podgorica City Stadium, Obert was only listed as a substitute and remained benched for the entirety of the 2–2 draw. However, three days later on 20 November at Tehelné pole against Chile, Obert made his senior international debut. He came on in the 80th minute of the match, with the score at 0–0, to replace Vernon De Marco as the left-back. Thus he became the last international to debut under the captainship of Marek Hamšík who was taken off the pitch less than ten minutes later in his final internationall walk off the pitch. During Obert's tenure on the pitch the scored did not change, remaining at 0–0.

Calzona continued to nominate Obert into March 2023, when he called him up ahead of two home UEFA Euro 2024 qualifiers versus Luxembourg and Bosnia and Herzegovina marking Obert's first competitive national team recognition.

Personal life
His grandfather Jozef was a former Czechoslovakia and Slovan Bratislava player. During his tenure in Sampdoria and Cagliari, Obert became fluent in Italian.

References

External links
 
 Lega Serie A Profile
 Futbalnet profile 

2002 births
Living people
Association football defenders
Footballers from Bratislava
Slovak footballers
Slovakia international footballers
Slovakia under-21 international footballers
Slovakia youth international footballers
Slovak expatriate footballers
Cagliari Calcio players
Serie A players
Serie B players
Slovak expatriate sportspeople in Italy
Expatriate footballers in Italy